Inocybe violaceocaulis is a species of mushroom native to Western Australia. Collections had been previously classified as I. geophylla var. lilacina.

References

violaceocaulis
Fungi described in 2005
Fungi native to Australia